The 2020 Constitution Party presidential primaries were a series of primary elections determining the allocation of delegates in the selection of the Constitution Party's presidential nominee in the 2020 United States presidential election. On May 2, 2020, the Constitution Party nominated Don Blankenship for president and William Mohr for vice-president. Several state parties split from the national Constitution Party to nominate their own candidates.

Background
Constitution Party nominees for president historically have received around 0.1% of the General Election vote. In 2016 with attorney Darrell Castle as its nominee, the party reached a milestone, receiving over 200,000 votes for president for the first time. During the early months of 2019, there was some consternation among Constitution Party members over a perceived lack of candidates for the nomination.

State affiliate disputes
After the Constitution Party chose Blankenship as its presidential nominee, there was substantial tension among several state affiliates of the Constitution Party over nominating Blankenship, who has been convicted of conspiring to willfully violate mine safety and health standards in relation to the Upper Big Branch Mine disaster. The same day that Blankenship was chosen as the nominee, the Constitution Party of Virginia broke with the national party, instead choosing to back Libertarian Justin Amash for the presidency.

On May 13, 2020, the Constitution Party of New Mexico also broke with the national CP, giving Blankenship's fellow candidate Samm Tittle their ballot line. Tittle was also endorsed by the Virginia Party after Amash withdrew from the presidential race. The Constitution Party of Idaho was reportedly considering not nominating William Mohr For Vice-President, and instead choosing their own vice-presidential nominee, but they eventually acquiesced and nominated him for vice-president.

Candidates

Nominee

Defeated at convention
The following candidates received at least 5% of the vote at the 2020 Constitution Party national convention.

Debates

Timeline

2019
August 30: Don J. Grundmann announced his campaign and filed his candidacy with the FEC.
September 11: Don Blankenship announced his campaign.
October 29: Charles Kraut announced his campaign and filed his candidacy with the FEC.
October 31: Don Blankenship filed his candidacy with the FEC.

2020
February 25: The first Constitution Party debate took place online, held by Constitution Party of Texas.
February 29: The second Constitution Party debate took place in Boise, Idaho.
March 3: The North Carolina primary took place. Uncommitted delegates win a majority.
March 4: Two Constitution Party candidates took part in the Free & Equal elections debate that took place in Chicago.
March 10: Blankenship won Idaho and Missouri.
April 1: The third Constitution Party debate took place online.
May 13: Tittle won New Mexico.

Primary and caucus calendar

Ballot access

Filing for the primaries began in August 2019.  indicates that the candidate was on the ballot for the upcoming primary contest and  indicates that the candidate did not appear on the ballot in that state's contest.

Results

North Carolina

Idaho

Missouri

New Mexico

Notes

See also
 2020 United States presidential election

National Conventions
 2020 Constitution Party National Convention
 2020 Republican National Convention
 2020 Democratic National Convention
 2020 Libertarian National Convention
 2020 Green National Convention

Presidential primaries
 2020 Republican Party presidential primaries
 2020 Democratic Party presidential primaries
 2020 Libertarian Party presidential primaries
 2020 Green Party presidential primaries

References

Constitution Party|Constitution
Constitution Party (United States) presidential primaries